The London Oriana Choir is a choral group comprising around 120 singers, based in London, England. It was formed in 1973 by Leon Lovett, who acted as conductor and musical director. David Drummond became the choir's musical director in 1996, and Dominic Ellis-Peckham began his term as musical director in September 2013.  The choir has developed a following through performances at London venues including the Royal Albert Hall, Barbican Centre, Royal Festival Hall and Queen Elizabeth Hall at Southbank, St Paul's Cathedral,  St Martin-in-the-Fields and St James' Piccadilly. In 2016 the choir launched a five year project 'Five 15' to promote the work of women composers with 15 new commissions from five composers, workshops and recordings. The five commissioned composers-in-residence were Cheryl Frances-Hoad (2016/17), Rebecca Dale (2017/18), Jessica Curry (2018/19), Anna Disley-Simpson (2019-2021), and Hannah Kendall (2021/22).

The choir tours regularly and since 2015 has performed in Portugal, Germany, Malta, Poland and Italy.

Notable performances

Under Dominic Ellis-Peckham 
 Celebrating the end of the Five 15 women composers initiative in July 2022 with a Women Composers Festival concert at the Queen Elizabeth Hall, London, with guest choirs and a number of women composers. 
 Performing the world premiere of Eric Whitacre's piece The Perfect Gift commissioned by Maggie's charity for a virtual carol concert in December 2020.
Performing with Madonna at the Eurovision Song Contest Final in Tel Aviv in May 2019.  The choir supplied the monks' chorus for "Like a Prayer".
Opening the BAFTA Games Awards ceremony in the Queen Elizabeth Hall, London, with a performance of The End of All Things by previous Award winner Jessica Curry. 
Launching a five year project 'Five 15' to promote the work of women composers in the Sammy Ofer gallery of the Cutty Sark, in Greenwich in July 2016.
Classic Quadrophenia, an orchestral and choral version of The Who's Quadrophenia album, released on Deutsche Grammophon in June 2015 and performed at the Royal Albert Hall in July 2015.

Under David Drummond 
 Missing God, a work by composer Sophie Viney commissioned under the Society for the Promotion of New Music's Adopt a Composer programme, and performed at St Martin-in-the-Fields in 2003 
 An invited performance at Mikhail Gorbachev's 80th birthday at the Lebedev residence at Hampton Court Palace near London 
 Performing with Beth Nielsen Chapman at St Paul's Cathedral for the DVD recording of "If love could say God's name"
 Performing with Robert Plant and his Band of Joy at the BBC Electric Proms in 2010, broadcast live on BBC2 (television) and BBC Radio 2
 Performing concerts composed solely of choral music composed by women to celebrate International Women's Day in 2012 and 2013
 Performing with Barbra Streisand at the Barbra Live concert series in London, UK at The O2 Arena

Under Leon Lovett 
Leon Lovett directed the choir from its inception until 1996. During this time, the choir regularly performed at the Royal Albert Hall, on BBC television and venues around London.

Recordings 
 E-single (2022): 'In the blue' by Anna Disley-Simpson (first release of a piece commissioned under the choir's Five15 initiative).
 E-singles (2019): 'In the stillness' by Sally Beamish, 'Vespertilians' by Jocelyn Hagen, and 'Laus Trinitati' by Felicia Sandler
"From Babylon to Brazil" (2015) featuring the world premiere recording of Toby Young's 'Ave Regina Caelorum'
"The Lady Oriana" (2016) featuring 'O nata lux' by award-winning composer Kerry Andrew.
"Nativitie", a Christmas album released in 2012. Includes the premiere recording of Kenneth Leighton's "Nativitie".
 Armstrong Gibbs "Odysseus" recorded with the BBC Concert Orchestra
 Walford Davies "Everyman" recorded with the Kensington Symphony Orchestra and released in 2008
"Stuff and Nonsense" (1999) featuring Richard Rodney Bennett's 'Nonsense' songs, John Gardner's 'Seven Songs' and George MacIlwham's 'Tam O'Shanter'.

References

External links 
 
 Musical Director: Dominic Ellis-Peckham

British choirs